Oxana Yevgeniyevna Rakhmatulina (born December 7, 1976 in Alma-Ata, Kazakh SSR) is a Russian-Kazakhstani basketball guard, who competed for the Russian National Team at the 2004 Summer Olympics, winning the bronze medal.

References
 Profile

1976 births
Living people
Basketball players at the 2004 Summer Olympics
Basketball players at the 2008 Summer Olympics
Kazakhstani women's basketball players
Medalists at the 2004 Summer Olympics
Medalists at the 2008 Summer Olympics
Olympic basketball players of Russia
Olympic bronze medalists for Russia
Olympic medalists in basketball
Russian people of Kazakhstani descent
Russian women's basketball players
Sportspeople from Almaty